Union 05 Käl Téiteng or Union 05 Football Club Kayl-Tétange is a football club, based in the commune of Kayl, in south-western Luxembourg.

Union 05 play their home games at the Stade Victor Marchal.

History
The club was formed in 2005 after a merger between FC Kayl 07 and SC Tétange. SC Tétange won the 1951 Luxembourg Cup.

In 2009 the club was promoted to the second tier-Luxembourg Division of Honour and in 2011 they became champions and were promoted for the first time to the Luxembourg National Division, the highest level of Luxembourg football. After two years they were relegated back and in 2016 the club was relegated to the third level Luxembourg 1. Division.

Honours

Domestic
as SC Tétange

Cup
Luxembourg Cup
Winners (1): 1951

Managers
 Luc Muller (July 2009 – Dec 09)
 Alvaro da Cruz (Jan 2010 – June 10)
 Manuel Correia (July 2010–)

References

External links
Union 05 Kayl-Tétange official website
Club page - FLF

Football clubs in Luxembourg
2005 establishments in Luxembourg
Association football clubs established in 2005